The 2009 St. Louis mayoral election was held on April 7, 2009 to elect the mayor of St. Louis, Missouri. It saw the reelection of incumbent mayor Francis Slay to a third term.

The election was preceded by party primaries on March 3.

Democratic primary 
Incumbent mayor Francis Slay was challenged for renomination by alderman Irene J. Smith as well as by Denise Coleman.

Green primary

Libertarian primary

Independent candidates 
Maida Coleman

General election

References

Mayoral elections in St. Louis
St. Louis
St. Louis
2000s in St. Louis
St. Louis